Gauri, occasionally spelt Gowri or Gouri, is a given name of India. It is derived from  'white', 'shining, brilliant', which is used as an epithet of the goddess Parvati, especially in the Mahagauri manifestation.

List of persons with the name
 Gauri Pradhan Tejwani (born 16 September 1964), Indian television actress
 Gauri Shinde, Indian ad-film and feature film director
 Gauri Karnik, Hindi and Marathi film actress
 Gauri Khan, Indian Film Producer and Interior Designer
 Gauri Shankar, Indian chess player and FIDE Master
 Gauri Malla, Nepali actress
 Gauri Ma (1857 – 1938), Indian disciple of Ramakrishna, companion of Sarada Devi
 Gauri Deshpande (1942–2003), novelist, short story writer, and poet from Maharashtra, India
 Gauri Ayyub (1931 – 1998), social worker, activist, writer and teacher based in Kolkata (Calcutta
 Gauri Pradhan, social activist and human rights defender in Nepal as well as in South Asia
 Gauri Shankar Pandey, veteran Indian politician and a former Minister of Bihar
 Protima Gauri (1948 – 1998),  Indian model turned odissi exponent
 Gauri Shankar Kalita (1955 – 2010), Indian journalist
 Gauri Shankar Rai, member of the Sixth Lok Sabha during 1977-79 representing Ghazipur constituency of Uttar Pradesh
 Gauri Shankar Shejwar, medical doctor by profession and one of the senior leaders of Bharatiya Janata Party in Madhya Pradesh
 Gauri Shankar Khadka, Nepalese politician, belonging to the Communist Party of Nepal (Maoist)

References

See also

Indian unisex given names